Paramount-Long Meadow is a census-designated place (CDP) in Washington County, Maryland, United States. The population was 2,722 at the 2000 census.

Geography
Paramount-Long Meadow is located at  (39.682795, −77.697175).

History 
The region of Washington County Maryland known today as Long Meadow was originally a large mostly level area covering close to twenty square-miles of agriculturally desirable land west of Antietam Creek.  One of the earliest transportation routes through the colony passed near this region, crossing the upper branches of Antietam Creek before turning southwest.  This was a route preferred by many of the early German and Swiss immigrant settlers to the Hagerstown area from central Pennsylvania.  The name Long Meadow derives from a land grant issued to Thomas Cresap (Sr.) in 1739.  Cresap's Long Meadow property would be transferred to investor Daniel Dulaney of Annapolis in 1746 and enlarged from 550 acres to 2131 acres.   "Long Meadow" and the region surrounding it would remain mostly agricultural until the mid-20th century.  In 1958 the name was revived with the opening of the region's first purpose-built shopping area, "Long Meadow Shopping Center" between Northern Avenue and Potomac Avenue / Leitersburg Pike.

Demographics

As of the census of 2000, there were 2,722 people, 985 households, and 778 families residing in the CDP. The racial makeup of the CDP was 93.64% White, 2.46% African American, 0.18% Native American, 2.42% Asian, 0.55% from other races, and 0.73% from two or more races. Hispanic or Latino of any race were 0.84% of the population.

There were 985 households, out of which 32.0% had children under the age of 18 living with them, 69.4% were married couples living together, 7.2% had a female householder with no husband present, and 21.0% were non-families. 18.3% of all households were made up of individuals, and 8.6% had someone living alone who was 65 years of age or older. The average household size was 2.59 and the average family size was 2.95.

In the CDP, the population was spread out, with 23.2% under the age of 18, 5.3% from 18 to 24, 21.1% from 25 to 44, 28.7% from 45 to 64, and 21.7% who were 65 years of age or older. The median age was 45 years. For every 100 females, there were 90.9 males. For every 100 females age 18 and over, there were 86.8 males.

The median income for a household in the CDP was $71,591, and the median income for a family was $82,072. Males had a median income of $58,015 versus $27,500 for females. The per capita income for the CDP was $29,309. About 2.1% of families and 1.5% of the population were below the poverty line, including none of those under age 18 and 4.2% of those age 65 or over.

References

Census-designated places in Washington County, Maryland
Census-designated places in Maryland